1140 Crimea, provisional designation , is a stony asteroid from the middle region of the asteroid belt, approximately 28 kilometers in diameter. It was discovered on 30 December 1929, by Soviet astronomer Grigory Neujmin at Simeiz Observatory on the Crimean peninsula, after which it was named.

Orbit and classification 

Crimea is a S-type asteroid in both the Tholen and SMASS taxonomic scheme. It orbits the Sun in the central main-belt at a distance of 2.5–3.1 AU once every 4 years and 7 months (1,685 days). Its orbit has an eccentricity of 0.11 and an inclination of 14° with respect to the ecliptic.

Lightcurves 

In April 2005, a rotational lightcurve of Crimea was obtained by American astronomer Robert Stephens at Santana Observatory in California. Lightcurve analysis gave a well-defined rotation period of 9.77 hours with a brightness variation of 0.30 magnitude. Photometric observations by amateur astronomers Federico Manzini and Pierre Antonini in March 2014, gave a concurring period of 9.784 hours with an amplitude of 0.23 magnitude. In addition, a modeled lightcurve using data from the Uppsala Asteroid Photometric Catalogue and other sources gave a period 9.7869 hours, as well as a spin axis of (12.0°, -73.0°) in ecliptic coordinates.

Diameter and albedo 

According to the surveys carried out by the Infrared Astronomical Satellite IRAS, the Japanese Akari satellite, and NASA's Wide-field Infrared Survey Explorer with its subsequent NEOWISE mission, Crimea measures between 27.75 and 29.18 kilometers in diameter, and its surface has an albedo between 0.160 and 0.177 (without preliminary results). The Collaborative Asteroid Lightcurve Link adopts the results obtained by IRAS, that is, an albedo of 0.1772 and a diameter of 27.75 kilometers with an absolute magnitude of 10.28.

Naming 

This minor planet was named for the Crimean Peninsula on the northern coast of the Black Sea, where the discovering Simeiz Observatory is located. Naming citation was first mentioned in The Names of the Minor Planets by Paul Herget in 1955.

References

External links 
 Asteroid Lightcurve Database (LCDB), query form (info )
 Dictionary of Minor Planet Names, Google books
 Asteroids and comets rotation curves, CdR – Observatoire de Genève, Raoul Behrend
 Discovery Circumstances: Numbered Minor Planets (1)-(5000) – Minor Planet Center
 The Centaur Research Project, 3D orbit for minor planet 1140 Crimea
 
 

001140
Discoveries by Grigory Neujmin
Named minor planets
001140
001140
19291230